Ibrahim Al-Saqqar (born January 20, 1984) is a Jordanian footballer who plays as a defender for Al-Baqa'a.

References

External links 
 
 jo.gitsport.net

Association football defenders
Al-Baqa'a Club players
Sahab SC players
Al-Jazeera (Jordan) players
Ittihad Al-Ramtha players
Mansheyat Bani Hasan players
Kufrsoum SC players
Al-Ramtha SC players
Jordanian footballers
1984 births
Living people